834 Naval Air Squadron (834 NAS) was a Naval Air Squadron of the Royal Navy's Fleet Air Arm. The squadron was formed in Jamaica in December 1941 as a torpedo bomber squadron equipped with Fairey Swordfish aircraft. The squadron was embarked on HMS Archer from March 1942 to February 1943 and involved in convoy escorted duties in the Atlantic and Mediterranean. 834 NAS then joined No. 19 Group RAF Coastal Command for duties in the English Channel. In June a flight of Supermarine Seafires was formed and the next month the squadron was embarked on HMS Hunter. The squadron took part in the Salerno landings in September, before being transferred to HMS Battler to provide convoy escort duties in the Indian Ocean. 834 NAS received a further flight of 6 Wildcat Vs in April 1944 and the Seafire flight was disbanded in July. The squadron returned to the UK in November 1944 and was disbanded in December.

834 NAS contained a number of New Zealanders seconded from the Royal New Zealand Naval Volunteer Reserve who served as pilots and, at one point, the squadron commander. In 1994 the designation of 834 Squadron was transferred from the Royal Navy to the Royal New Zealand Navy.

The Fleet Air Arm Museum contains a surviving Fairey Swordfish (HS618) which was operated by 834 NAS from May 1943 until it was damaged in the hanger of HMS Hunter during bad weather. It is currently painted in the colours of 813 Naval Air Squadron.

References

800 series Fleet Air Arm squadrons
Military units and formations established in 1941
Military units and formations of the Royal Navy in World War II
Royal New Zealand Navy